King's Dock may refer to
King's Dock, Port of Liverpool
King's Dock, New York, near Garrison, New York
King's Dock, Swansea
 Kings Dock at Canarsie Pier
King's Dockyard (1797-1833), the first dockyard in the colony of New South Wales.